Ironmould Lane is a cricket ground in Bristol.  The first recorded match on the ground was in 1894, when Brislington played Peasedown St John.  In 1969 the ground held its first List-A match when Somerset played Surrey in the Player's County League.  The following season the ground held its final List-A match when Somerset played Derbyshire in the John Player League.

Still in use to this day, the ground is the home venue of Brislington Cricket Club.

References

External links
Ironmould Lane on CricketArchive
Ironmould Lane on Cricinfo

Cricket grounds in Bristol
Sports venues completed in 1894